The  is a producer of Japanese whisky and other beverages headquartered in Tokyo. It is owned by Asahi Group Holdings.

The company operates a number of distilleries and other facilities in Japan, including two Japanese whisky distilleries, the Yoichi distillery in Yoichi, Hokkaidō (established in 1934), and the Miyagikyo distillery in Aoba-ku, Sendai, Miyagi Prefecture, Northern Honshū (established in 1969). It also owns the Ben Nevis Distillery (acquired in 1989) in Scotland.

History

The founder, Masataka Taketsuru, travelled to Scotland in 1918 to learn the process of distilling Scotch whisky first hand. He studied organic chemistry under Prof. T. S. Patterson at the University of Glasgow and malt whisky production at the Hazelburn distillery, in Campbeltown near the Mull of Kintyre. He married Jessie Roberta "Rita" Cowan, the daughter of a Glasgow doctor, and returned with her to Japan in 1920. In 1923 he joined Kotobukiya (currently Suntory) and helped to establish a distillery before starting Nikka in 1934.

After their deaths, the company was run by their adoptive son, Takeshi Taketsuru, who expanded its business substantially.

Products

Nikka produces a wide variety of Japanese whiskies, ranging from ¥900 (per 700 ml bottle) Black Nikka sold in Japanese convenience stores, to the ¥15,750 (per 750 ml bottle) Nikka Single Cask. In 2008, Yoichi 20 Year Old was voted best single malt at the World Whiskies Awards.

Black Nikka is a 37% alcoholic whisky, available at corner stores throughout Japan in 180, 300, 700, 1800, 1920, 2700, and 4000 mL bottles. Individual servings, pre-mixed with soda or water, are also available.

Nikka has been owned by Asahi Group Holdings since 1954.

Whiskies
Yoichi Single Malt
Miyagikyo Single Malt
From The Barrel
Taketsuru Pure Malt
Taketsuru Pure Malt 17-Year
Coffey Malt
Coffey Grain
Pure Malt Red
Pure Malt Black
Pure Malt White
All Malt
Blended
Ben Nevis

Distilleries and plants

Yoichi distillery, Hokkaido Plant (Yoichi, Hokkaido) – malt whisky distilling, bottling
Miyagikyo distillery, Sendai Plant (Sendai, Miyagi) – malt whisky distilling, grain whisky production, bottling
Hirosaki Plant (Hirosaki, Aomori) – cider, brandy and wine brewing, distilling, bottling
Tochigi Plant (Sakura, Tochigi) – grain whisky storage & ageing, re-storage of blended whisky
Kashiwa Plant (Kashiwa, Chiba) – bottling
Nishinomiya Plant (Nishinomiya, Hyogo) – liqueur bottling
Moji Plant (Kitakyushu, Fukuoka) – shōchū distilling, bottling
Ben Nevis distillery (Fort William, Scotland, UK) – Scotch whisky production

References

Notes

Bibliography

External links

Nikka English-language website

Distilleries in Japan
Japanese brands
Japanese whisky
Food and drink companies based in Tokyo
Manufacturing companies based in Tokyo
Food and drink companies established in 1934
Japanese companies established in 1934